Thomas Manners-Sutton (6 August 1795 – 27 October 1844) was an English clergyman who served as Chaplain to the Speaker of the House of Commons.

Manners-Sutton was the fourth son of Lieutenant-Colonel John Manners-Sutton. He was educated at Eton College and Trinity College, Cambridge  (matriculated 1809, graduated B.A. 1813, M.A. 1817).

In 1824, Manners-Sutton was appointed the 52nd Chaplain to the Speaker of the House of Commons by his first cousin, Speaker Charles Manners-Sutton.

Manners-Sutton held the following positions in the church:
 Prebendary of Westminster Abbey, 1817–31
 Rector of Tunstall, Kent, 1827–36
 Rector of Great Chart, Kent, 1818–36
 Prebendary and Sub-Dean of Lincoln Cathedral, 1831–44
 Rector of Averham with Kelham, Nottinghamshire, 1837–44

On 23 November 1826, he married Lucy Sarah Mortimer, daughter of Rev. Hans Sanders Mortimer.

Manners-Sutton died on 27 October 1844.

References

1795 births
1844 deaths
People educated at Eton College
Alumni of Trinity College, Cambridge
Chaplains of the House of Commons (UK)
Canons of Westminster